Rīgas Vagonbūves Rūpnīca (RVR) was a Latvian rail and tram vehicle manufacturer, most notable for its multiple unit trains and tram vehicles used throughout the Soviet Union and its successor states. It has been insolvent and non-operational since 2017.

History
The original works were founded in 1895 by the businessman Oscar Freywirth under the name Fēnikss. In 1936, Fenikss was reorganised into Joint Stock Company Vairogs, which later manufactured Ford-Vairogs automobiles under licence. Expropriated by the state following the takeover of Latvia by the Soviet Union and renamed RVR, it became for many years the largest producer of electric and diesel trains in the USSR and also produced tramcars.  Its best known products are the ER1, ER2, ER7, ER9 and ER31 electric trains, DR1, DR1A and DR1P diesel trains, many of which are still in service today. Between 1973 and 1988 it built the high-speed ER200 train. Following the collapse of the Soviet Union and the Comecon, the factory ceased operations in 1996 and was declared bankrupt in 1998. Part of the property was bought  by Severstal, a company controlled by Russian oligarch Alexey Mordashov. In 2001 the factory was bought by a holding company and continued sales were primarily orders for the refurbishment of units it had previously manufactured. After its ownership structure changed several times it entered insolvency in 2017, following a dearth of orders for new vehicles for several years and several failed attempts at partnerships with other rail manufacturers.

Products

Trains
AR-1 first produced 1969
AR-2 first produced 1997
DR-1 / DR-1P / DR-1A / DR-1B beginning in 1963
ER-1 first produced 1957
ER-2 / ER-2R / ER-2T beginning  in 1962
ER-3 produced 1963
ER-6 prototype only in 1965
ER-7 first produced 1957
ER-9 / ER-9P / ER-9M / ER-9E / ER-9ET / ER-9T first produced 1962
ER-10 first produced 1960
ER-11 produced 1965 
ER-12 first produced 1976
Er-200 first produced 1974

Trams

From 1923 to 1930 the factory produced some 40 tram cars for Riga. After World War II, in 1949 the factory started producing the MTV-82 tram. Between 1960 and 1989 more than 6000 RVR-6 tram cars were built.

Current operators
Many RVR trains built during the Soviet period are still in active service across the former USSR.  Current operators are shown below.  Very few, if any, RVR tramcars are still in operation, with most cities of the former USSR favouring tramcars built by ČKD Tatra.

See also
 Category:Electric multiple units of Russia at Wikimedia Commons

References

External links
 Official website of RVR

1895 establishments in the Russian Empire
Companies based in Riga
Manufacturing companies of the Soviet Union
Rolling stock manufacturers of Latvia
Tram manufacturers
Companies nationalised by the Soviet Union

Latvian brands
Ministry of Heavy and Transport Machine-Building (Soviet Union)
Electric vehicle manufacturers of Latvia